George Allen Prescott (March 6, 1913 – February 1988) was a Republican member of the Michigan House of Representatives representing the northeastern part of the Lower Peninsula between 1967 and 1978.

A native of Tawas City, Prescott graduated from Western Reserve Academy and Michigan State University. He was Iosco County clerk from 1951 until his election to the House. Prescott was the third generation of his family elected to the Legislature (his grandfather, George A. Prescott, was a state senator in the late 1890s and secretary of state in the early 1900s, and his uncle, Charles T. Prescott, was a state senator from 1945 to 1961).

References

1913 births
1988 deaths
Republican Party members of the Michigan House of Representatives
People from Iosco County, Michigan
Michigan State University alumni
County officials in Michigan
20th-century American politicians